The 2007 UEFA Women's Cup Final was played on 21 and 29 April 2007 between Arsenal of England and Umeå of Sweden. It was the first final not to feature German teams since the 2003 final. Arsenal won 1–0 on aggregate.

Arsenal were chasing an unprecedented quadruple of titles having already secured the England women's premier league, Women's FA Cup and Women's Premier League Cup. They were the first English team to reach the UEFA Women's Cup Final and to date the only English winner of the competition. Chelsea W.F.C reached the 2021 final but ultimately lost to Barcelona Feminine making them only the second English side to reach the final.

Arsenal W.F.C have gone on to reach three more semi-finals (2011, 2012, 2013) since the competition's name was rebranded to the UEFA Women's Champion's League but never the final, being knocked out by Olympic Lyonnais Feminine, Wolfsburg Fauren and Frankfurt Fauren. With two of their semi-final conquers going on to lift the trophy.

Umeå would go on to reach back to back finals but would ultimately lose to Frankfurt Fauren by a score of 4-3 over two legs. That would end up being the Swedish side's  last final in the competition.

Match details

First leg

Second leg

References

Women's Cup
Uefa Women's Cup Final 2007
Uefa Women's Cup Final 2007
2007
UEFA
UEFA
2006–07 in English women's football
April 2007 sports events in Europe
Sports competitions in Umeå
UEFA Women's Cup Final, 2007